Narew National Park is a National Park in Podlaskie Voivodeship, north-eastern Poland, created in 1996.
The park is a  section of the Narew River. It is a swampy valley with moraine hills typical of a braided river. Depending on the season and the level of the water table, several riparian area ecosystems are available including swamps, tussocks with surrounding black alder and white willow forested areas.

The park covers the Upper Narew Valley, a swampy area between the towns of Suraz and Rzedziany.  Around 90% of Park's area are either swamps or waters with the Narew as the main river, which splits in the area into many river beds, but also numerous smaller rivers, such as Liza, Szeroka Struga, Awissa, Kurówka, Kowalówka, Turośnianka and Czaplinianka.

The Park's landscape is predominantly made up by many varieties of marshes, reed beds,  and there are also meadows and forests. The Narew Valley is a haven for birds - there are 179 species of them, including those unique for the area. Mammals are represented by around 40 species, among them some elk and otter as well as numerous beavers - around 260 of them. The Park's waters are full of fish - 22 species - as well as amphibians. The Park is a wetland site protected under the Ramsar convention.

Cultural attractions of the Park are mostly represented by buildings such as numerous traditional village huts, ancient crosses by the roads and windmills. One of the Park's attractions is a private archaeological museum, owned by Władysław Litwinczuk. The Park also includes an antique manor house at Kurowo.

The Park has its headquarters in the village of Kurowo. Its buffer zone includes a less strictly protected area called Narew Landscape Park.

References

External links
 Official Narew National Park website
 The Board of Polish National Parks: Narew National Park

National parks of Poland
Parks in Podlaskie Voivodeship
Natura 2000 in Poland
Ramsar sites in Poland
1996 establishments in Poland
Protected areas established in 1996
Wysokie Mazowieckie County
Central European mixed forests